Save Your Soul is an EP by She Wants Revenge, released in 2008.

Track listing
"Sugar" – 4:55
"Save Your Soul" – 3:30 
"Sleep" – 4:54
"A Hundred Kisses" – 4:24

2008 EPs
She Wants Revenge albums